Chamisul is a brand of soju manufactured by South Korean company HiteJinro. It is the most popular brand of liquor in the world. The name "Chamisul," meaning "dew" in Korean, was created by Son Hye-won, the representative of Cross Point to represent the dew on the bottles of cold soju. It is also the Korean-reading of the hanja Jin-ro (眞露), the name of the company. Chamisul Original is 20.1% ABV, and Chamisul Fresh is 17% ABV.

Available Volume 

 200, 360, 400, 640 mL
 1.8 L

History 

 October 9, 1998: First produced with 23% ABV.
 February 2001: Lowered ABV to 22% and redesigned the logo.
                Lowered ABV to 21%.
 February 2006: Lowered ABV to 20.1%.
 December 2009: Changed the logo and label.
             : Chamisul (17.8% ABV), Chamisul CLASSIC (20.1% ABV) renewal.
 April 2018: Chamisul Fresh (17.2% ABV) renewal.
 March 2019: Chamisul Fresh (17% ABV) renewal.

Chamisul Fresh 
Chamisul Fresh is a product with a lowered alcohol content. On April 09, 2018, it was announced that the alcohol content will be lowered from 17.8% to 17.2% ABV starting April 16, 2018. From March 18, 2019, it was lowered again to 17% ABV. After the introduction of Chamisul Fresh on August 18, 2006, the brand was called both "Chamjinisulro" and "Chamisul." In December 2009, it was decided that "Chamisul" would be the sole name.

Chamisul Original 
Chamisul Classic is the derivative of the original Chamisul, with a 20.1% ABV. It was announced on September 11, 2017 that the name will be changed to Chamisul Original.

External links 

 제품 소개 (Website of HiteJinro (in Korean))

References 

Alcoholic drink brands
1998 establishments in South Korea
South Korean brands
Soju
South Korean alcoholic drinks